The 1993 Arab Cup Winners' Cup was the fourth edition of the Arab Cup Winners' Cup held in Doha, Qatar between 20 Jan – 2 Feb 1994, one year after. The teams represented Arab nations from Africa and Asia.
CO Casablanca of Morocco won the final consecutively for the third time, against Al-Qadisiyah of Saudi Arabia.

Group stage

Group 1

Group 2

Knock-out stage

Semi-finals

Final

Winners

External links
Arab Cup Winners' Cup 1993 - rsssf.com

Arab Cup Winners' Cup
1994 in Qatari sport
1994 in association football
January 1994 sports events in Asia
February 1994 sports events in Asia
International association football competitions hosted by Qatar